Waverly is an unincorporated community in Harrison Township, Morgan County, in the U.S. state of Indiana.

History
Waverly had its start about 1837 by the building of the canal through that territory. At one time, Waverly was one of two sites in the running to become Indiana's state capital. A post office was established at Waverly in 1862, and remained in operation until it was discontinued in 1927. Located alongside the White River, the Waverly community suffered severe flooding, most recently in 2008. Much of the area was then purchased by Morgan County for recreational purposes. Old Town Waverly Park is now open on the original site of the village of Waverly. The Waverly Bank building has been retained and restored to act as a museum of sorts and a traditional arts area is available for demonstrations of blacksmithing, tinsmithing and other traditional arts. A paved, two mile riverwalk trail for pedestrian and bicycle use follows the river.

Geography

References

Unincorporated communities in Morgan County, Indiana
Unincorporated communities in Indiana
Indianapolis metropolitan area